Indian Idol is an Indian singing reality show of Sony TV. It is an Indian version of the British show Pop Idol  and is part of Indian Idol series. It has aired on Sony Entertainment Television since 2004. The show has spawned spin-off like Indian Idol Junior, which replaced the show for the seventh and eight seasons. 

Its production and taping take place in Mumbai, Maharashtra. It broadcast on Saturdays and Sundays and digitally air on Sony Liv application.

On 15 August 2021, Pawandeep Rajan won the last season. 

Season 13 is the present edition of the show, Himesh Reshammiya and Vishal Dadlani are the judges, while one or two guest judges related to Hindi films appears every week.

Summary

Season 1 

 Judges

Anu Malik

Farah Khan

Sonu Nigam

 Host

Aman Verma

Mini Mathur

Top 12 Contestants

Season 2 

 Judges

Anu Malik

Farah Khan

Sonu Nigam

 Host

Mini Mathur Aman Verma

Top 12 Contestants

Season 3 

 Judges

Javed Akhtar

Anu Malik

Alisha Chinai

Udit Narayan

 Host

Hussain Kuwajerwala

Mini Mathur

Top 13 Contestants

Season 4 
The fourth season of Indian Idol was aired on Sony TV from 19 September 2008 to 1 March 2009. For the first time in Indian Idol history, there were two women among the top three finalists. Sourabhee Debbarma who hails from Agartala, Tripura  won the competition and became the first female contestant to do so. By doing so, she also won a contract of Rs. 1 crore with Sony Entertainment Television and a TATA Winger. She released an album, Meherbaan, as per a contract with Sony. Kapil Thapa was runner-up while Torsha Sarkar finished third.

One of the contestants, Bhavya Pandit, received an offer to sing the song "Aaja Lehraate" for the film What's Your Raashee, alongside singer Gautam Mrinaal.

 Judges

Javed Akhtar

Anu Malik

Sonali Bendre

Kailash Kher

 Host

Hussain Kuwajerwala

Meiyang Chang

Top 14 Contestants

Season 5 

 Judges

Anu Malik

Sunidhi Chauhan

Salim Merchant

 Host

Hussain Kuwajerwala

Abhijeet Sawant

Top 13 Contestants 

Note: Sreerama, Rakesh, and Bhoomi were the top 3. Sreeram was crowned the winner without announcing the 1st and 2nd runner-ups.

Season 6 
The sixth season aired on Sony TV from 1 June 2012 to 1 September 2012. The winner of the sixth season was Vipul Mehta.

 Judges

Anu Malik

Sunidhi Chauhan

Salim Merchant

Asha Bhosle

 Host

Hussain Kuwajerwala

Mini Mathur

On 23 June 2012, the judges selected the top 16 contestants to perform in the Gala Rounds.

Contestants

Indian Idol Junior Season 1 

 Judges

Vishal Dadlani

Shreya Ghoshal

Shekhar Ravjiani

 Host

Karan Wahi

Mandira Bedi

Top 11 Contestants

Indian Idol Junior Season 2 
Indian Idol Junior Season 2 started on30 May 2015 and finished on 6 September 2015.

 Judges

Salim Merchant

Sonakshi Sinha replaced Shalmali Kholgade 

Vishal Dadlani

 Host

Hussain Kuwajerwala

Asha Negi

Top 13 Contestants

Season 9 

 Judges

Anu Malik

Farah Khan

Sonu Nigam

 Host

Karan Wahi

Paritosh Tripathi

Top 14 Contestants

Season 10 

 Judges

Javed Ali replaced Anu Malik

Neha Kakkar

Vishal Dadlani

 Host

Manish Paul

Top 14 Contestants

Season 11 
The 11th season started to air on 12 October 2019 on Sony TV. It was being hosted by singer Aditya Narayan. Neha Kakkar has returned as one of the judges on popular demand along with Vishal Dadlani and Anu Malik, who came back to the show as a judge after his suspension from the judging panel for Me Too allegations. He was then been replaced by Himesh Reshammiya.

 Judges

Himesh Reshammiya replaced Anu Malik

Neha Kakkar

Vishal Dadlani

 Host 

Aditya Narayan

Top 16 contestants

Season 12 
The 12th season started on 28 November 2020 on Sony TV. The grand finale aired from 12 noon to 12 midnight on 15 August 2021. Pawandeep Rajan was declared the winner of the season and Arunita Kanjilal became the 1st Runner-up. This was the longest running season of Indian Idol.

 Judges

Anu Malik

Sonu Kakkar

Himesh Reshammiya

 Former judges

Vishal Dadlani

Neha Kakkar

Although Vishal Dadlani, Neha Kakkar and Himesh Reshammiya were the original judges, when the shoot shifted out of Mumbai, then Vishal Dadlani, and Neha Kakkar couldn't join and makers replaced them by Anu Malik and Sonu Kakkar.

 Host 

Aditya Narayan

 Former Hosts 

Bharti Singh

Haarsh Limbachiyaa

Rithvik Dhanjani

Jay Bhanushali

Aditya Narayan was the original host but Bharti & Harsh, Rithvik and Jay replaced him when he came out to be COVID +ve. Bharti and Harsh replaced him on February 28.

Top 15 contestants

Season 13 

The Ground Auditions started in July 2022. The show started on 10 September 2022. The finale date is set to be April 2, 2023. 

 Judges

Himesh Reshammiya 

Vishal Dadlani

 Host

Aditya Narayan

Former Judge

Neha Kakkar

 Former Host

Haarsh Limbachiyaa

Top 15 Contestants

Note : Vineet and Kavya were eliminated in a double elimination.

The judges have decided to do a power play for 4 weeks and let the audience decide who they want to see in the Top 7. Elimination will happen after the 4 weeks power play. The 4 week power-play is completed and Navdeep Wadali got eliminated.

Criticism 
Sunidhi Chauhan who judged this show's seasons 5 and 6, in her interview with Vicky Lalwani of The Economic Times youtube channel revealed that this show's makers asked her and other judges to praise every contestant.  According to Lalwani since 2022, judges of Indian Idol do not give critical comments or point out flaws in singing after a contestant performed, and they praise everyone, and the audience also gets confused. In 2021, Amit Kumar also expressed the same thing after he appeared as a guest judge, he said that the makers of Indian Idol specifically told him while filming that you have to praise every contestant and not criticize. 
In 2018, a participant Nishant Kaushik revealed on Twitter the suffering of the people who come for the auditions of this show. He expressed his experience with his Indian Idol audition. He elaborated that, he participated in the 2012 Indian Idol audition, people of this show do not give any service to the participants, and contestants kept standing with no access to food, drinking water, or toilet. Former host of Indian idol Mini Mathur in response to this tweet thread wrote these kinds of things happened in Indian reality shows, that is why she quit doing work in them.  
In 2021 many fans alleged the show for showing scripted stories to gain TRP. In the season fans expressed on social media that the love angle of Pawandeep Rajan and Arunita Kanjilal was fake, and makers are deliberately trying to show the love angle.  The show frequently alleged of showing fake emotional, drama and sob stories of the contestants. Amid the 12th season viewers slammed makers for altering the performance of Pawandeep Ranjan. In one of the season the makers scripted fake love story between show's judge Neha Kakkar and host Aditya Narayan, the latter's father Udit Narayan even came to fix his relationship with Kakkar, some of the audience felt this real but at the end, it was revealed to be fake.

References 

Sony Entertainment Television original programming
Television series by Fremantle (company)
2004 Indian television series debuts
Indian television series based on British television series
Indian Idol (Hindi TV series)
Indian Idol